The Atatürk Cup was a football competition in Turkey. The first edition was played between the winners of the Prime Minister's Cup and the Presidential Cup in 1998 to memorialize the 60th anniversary of Atatürk's death. Fenerbahçe defeated Beşiktaş 2–0.The second and last edition of the tournament was played as a de facto Super Cup in 2000. As Galatasaray won the double that season, the runners-up of the Turkish Super League (Beşiktaş) became their opponent. Beşiktaş defeated Galatasaray 2–1.

Champions

Performance

See also
Prime Minister's Cup
Turkish Super Cup

References

 
Defunct football cup competitions in Turkey
1955 establishments in Turkey
Recurring sporting events established in 1955
Recurring sporting events disestablished in 2000
2000 disestablishments in Turkey
Things named after Mustafa Kemal Atatürk